Maya–Maya Airport  is the international airport of Brazzaville, the capital of the Republic of the Congo.

Facilities
The older runway was repaired and now is used as a taxiway. A second phase of the new terminal was completed in 2013, the construction of which, valued at $160 million, was undertaken by Chinese construction firm Weihai International Economic & Technical Cooperative Co., Ltd.

Airlines and destinations

Passenger

Cargo

Accidents and incidents
 On 19 September 1989 UTA Flight 772, a McDonnell Douglas DC-10-30 (registration N54629) operating the Brazzaville-N'Djamena-Paris CDG sector, was bombed 46 minutes after take-off from N'Djamena causing the aircraft to crash while flying over Niger. All 156 passengers and 14 crew members on board perished. For nearly 20 years, this incident marked the deadliest air disaster involving a French-operated airliner, in terms of loss of life. As of June 2009, it ranks as the second-deadliest (see Air France Flight 447).
 23 November 1996: Hijackers forced Ethiopian Airlines Flight 961, bound from Mumbai and Addis Ababa to Abidjan through many stops (including Brazzaville), to crash into the Indian Ocean.
 On 26 August 2009, an Antonov An-12 of Aero-Fret (registered TN-AIA) crashed on approach. The flight had originated from Pointe Noire Airport. The five Ukrainian crew and one Congolese passenger were killed.
 On 30 November 2012, an Aéro-Service (initially mistakenly attributed to Trans Air Congo) Ilyushin Il-76T on a cargo flight from Pointe Noire to Brazzaville crashed during landing short of runway 5L at Maya–Maya Airport in Brazzaville in bad weather, in a residential area. All six crew members, five of them from Armenia, one police officer on board the aircraft, and 26 people on the ground were killed, and 14 people on the ground were injured.

References

External links
 
 
 
 
 OpenStreetMap - Brazzaville

Airports in the Republic of the Congo
Buildings and structures in Brazzaville